René Lopez (born 5 April 1964) is a Colombian Olympic show jumping rider. He competed at the 2016 Summer Olympics in Rio de Janeiro, Brazil, where he finished 55th in the individual competition.

References

Living people
1964 births
Colombian male equestrians
Equestrians at the 2016 Summer Olympics
Equestrians at the 2015 Pan American Games
Olympic equestrians of Colombia
Pan American Games competitors for Colombia
20th-century Colombian people
21st-century Colombian people